Anna Henryka Pustowójtówna (1838 in Stare Wierzchowiska – 1881 in Paris) was a Polish activist and soldier, famed for her participation in the  January Uprising.

She was the daughter of a Polish noblewoman, Marianna Kossakowska, and of a Russian officer, Teofil Pustaya, of Hungarian origin. He later became a general. After convent schooling in Lublin, she attended a finishing school in Pulawy. Despite her mixed parentage, she thought of herself as a Pole. Already in her early twenties she was arrested in 1861 for civil disobedience (singing religious hymns in public). She was sentenced to detention in an Orthodox convent in Russia, but she escaped. She made her way to Moldova, where she joined Polish partisans who were forming into units.

She became an activist in the Polish independence movement and fought in the January Uprising as adjutant to Commander Marian Langiewicz. She disguised herself as a male soldier and went by the alias "Michał Smok".

She was captured and imprisoned by the Austrian authorities and upon release she moved first to Prague, then Switzerland and finally France, where she worked as a nurse in the Paris Commune of 1870. In 1873 she married a physician, Dr. Loewenhardt, whom she had known during the Uprising in Poland. They had four children. After the death of her sister-in-law, she took over the care of the two orphaned children. She died in her sleep in Paris.

References

External links
 "A Catalogue of Female Cross-Dressers", last accessed February 9, 2006
 Article in Great Soviet Encyclopedia (Russian).
 

1838 births
1881 deaths
Burials at Montparnasse Cemetery
Female wartime cross-dressers
Women in 19th-century warfare
Women in European warfare
Polish female soldiers
Polish nationalists
January Uprising participants